Sissela Nordling Blanco (born 5 April 1988) is a Swedish politician, and since March 2011 spokesperson of the Feminist Initiative party, serving together with Gudrun Schyman and Stina Svensson.

Biography
Born in 1988 in Uppsala, she grew up there and in Temuco, Chile. Her maternal grandfather is Hugo Blanco, a Peruvian left-wing peasant leader, former presidential candidate, and socialist member of parliament. Blanco came to Sweden as a political refugee in 1976, where his daughter Carmen Blanco Valer (born 1959) grew up and, among other things, became Chairperson of Solidarity Sweden-Latin America.

Chosen as spokesperson of the feminist political party Feminist Initiative in March 2011, Sissela Nordling Blanco is a candidate for the Riksdag in the September 2014 general election. She lives in Stockholm, where she, in addition to her political work, is a project leader for Fanzingo, a media house for youths in Alby, Botkyrka Municipality. Nordling Blanco has previously worked as a graphic designer and lecturer, and with the feminist and anti-racist think tank Interfem. She was an editor for the book Makthandbok för unga feminister som (be)möter rasism och sexism i föreningslivet published in 2009, and again for its second edition in 2011.

She is also one of the founders of the anti-racist and queer feminist festival Uppsala Pride, which she helped organize in 2007-2009.

References

Living people
1988 births
Feminist Initiative (Sweden) politicians
Swedish people of Peruvian descent
Leaders of political parties in Sweden
Politicians from Uppsala
21st-century Swedish politicians